The Taichung BRT (Chinese: 臺中快捷巴士) was a bus rapid transit (BRT) system located in Taichung which stretched from Taichung TRA station to Providence University via Taiwan Boulevard, a major thoroughfare. It was the first BRT line in Taiwan. The line was converted to a dedicated bus lane for conventional buses on July 8, 2015, and the BRT is no longer in operation.

Design and construction 

An MRT system in Taichung has been planned since 1990; however, because of the high cost of building MRT system, the plan was never carried out. The Taichung City Government began planning for a BRT system in place of a MRT primarily because it would cost 25 times less. The BRT was promoted as an alternative during rush hour, since it ran on a designated lane.

The system was entirely composed of articulated buses. Unlike conventional buses, the fare was to be paid at the stations, not on the bus. The stations featured ticket gates at the entrance of the station, as well as automatic platform gates that would open and close simultaneously with bus doors. Signal priority was to be given to the buses to save travel time.

The director of Taichung Bureau of Transportation, Mr. Lin, also stated that if one day MRT is constructed, BRT will still be operating instead of being replaced by MRT.

Articulated buses were legalized in Taiwan in February 2012, and construction of BRT blue line started in November 2013. The line opened for the public on July 27, 2014.

Operation 
The line opened for the public on July 27, 2014. The Blue Line operated between the Taichung TRA Station in Central District and Providence University in Shalu District, with a control center located in Shalu. It took 40 minutes to get from one terminal to another. The route had a dedicated on both sides, except for the section on Taiwan Boulevard Sect. 1 and between the stations Fu'an and Maple Valley Park. A bus arrived approximately every 5–10 minutes to a station. Operation began at 6:00 AM and ended at 11:00 PM at the Taichung Train Station, and began at 5:00 and ended at 10:00 PM at Providence University.

Features 
All buses are articulated buses.
Unlike conventional buses, BRT fares are charged in BRT stations, not on the buses.
All BRT stations are fitted with automatic platform gates open or close simultaneously with the bus doors.
Signal priority are installed at the intersection of BRT route to shorten traveling time.

Criticism 
Taichung BRT blue line was open to the public on July 28; however, many of the facilities were still under construction, which prompted much criticism. Based on a poll conducted in August 2014, only 16.9% of the passengers were satisfied with the system, and only 25.5% of the passengers said that they would change how they travel based on the new service. However, on September 13, according to the poll carried out by the Taichung Youth City Government (台中青年市政府), 51% of the passengers were satisfied with the BRT system, 37% felt indifferent, and 12% were dissatisfied with the system. Proponents of the system stated that because of the BRT lane's signal priority and designated lane, travel time became much shorter.

List of stations

Closure 

In November 2014, Taichung elected a new mayor Lin Chia-lung. On December 27, 2014, the newly elected mayor visited the temporary BRT operation center; he criticized the system, calling it a hoax. He pointed out that the 4 billion cost was unjustified and identified the five main deficiencies of the system. He called a total demolition of the system. The decision did not come without opposition; on Jan 24, almost all of the citizens participating in a public forum were against abolishing the system, stating that the system was a lot more efficient than standard buses and the government should just improve on existing facilities. However, despite the opponents of abolishing the BRT, it ceased operations on July 8, 2015.

Following the discontinuation of the BRT system and conversion into a standard bus lane, the articulated buses and stations continued to be used. The buses were renamed as bus routes 300, 309, and 310, and now share the lane with conventional low-floor buses. Smart cards now have to be swiped on the bus and the BRT equipment at the stations has been deactivated.

See also 
 Chiayi Bus Rapid Transit

References 

Bus transportation in Taiwan
Transportation in Taichung
2014 establishments in Taiwan
2015 disestablishments in Taiwan